The silver-throated bushtit or silver-throated tit (Aegithalos glaucogularis) is a species of bird in the family Aegithalidae.
It is widely spread throughout central and eastern China and south towards Yunnan. Its natural habitat is temperate forests.

History
A paper on the silver-throated bushtit by the English naturalist Frederic Moore was read at a meeting of the Zoological Society of London on 27 June 1854. The English ornithologist John Gould then included the silver-throated bushtit in his book The Birds of Asia and cited Moore's paper. Gould used Moore's specific name but a different genus to obtain the binomial name Mecistura glaucogularis. He specified the type locality as Shanghai. As Gould's work appeared in print in 1855 before the publication of the proceedings of the Zoological Society, under the rules of the International Code of Zoological Nomenclature Gould's publication has priority.  The name glaucogularis combines the Latin glaucus "glaucous" and the New Latin gularis "throated".

Taxonomy

The silver-throated bushtit was formerly considered a subspecies of the long-tailed tit (Aegithalos caudatus) but the plumage is distinctive and there are significant genetic differences.

Two subspecies are recognised:
 A. g. vinaceus (Verreaux, J, 1871) – central and northeast China
 A. g. glaucogularis (Gould, 1855) – east central China

References

External links
Xeno-canto: audio recordings of the silver-throated bushtit

silver-throated bushtit
Birds of China
Birds of Yunnan
Endemic birds of China
silver-throated bushtit
silver-throated bushtit